Romeo "Jon-jon" Masupil Jalosjos Jr. (born November 4, 1971) is a Filipino politician from the province of Zamboanga del Norte. He served as representative for the 1st district of Zamboanga del Norte from 2019 until his removal from the post in 2022.

Early life with Romeo Jalosjos Sr. and corresponding political tenure
He is the son of the convicted child rapist Romeo G. Jalosjos, who was convicted by RTC Judge Roberto Diokno and later by the Supreme Court despite claims of parliamentary privilege from arrest as a congressman.

Jalosjos ran and won as mayor of Tampilisan, Zamboanga del Norte in the 2007 local elections. In 2010, he ran for and won as a representative of Zamboanga Sibugay's second legislative district defeating incumbent representative Dulce Ann Hofer, daughter of Governor George Hofer. In 2013, he ran for re-election against Ann Hofer again, but was defeated. In 2016, he ran for governor of that province against incumbent governor Wilter Palma, but was defeated. In 2019, he ran for and won as a representative of Zamboanga del Norte's first legislative district to succeed the incumbent Bullet Jalosjos.

House of Representatives
In the 18th Congress, he was currently one of the vice chairpersons of the House Committee on Appropriations, and a member of the House Committee on Civil Service and Professional Regulation.

He was re-elected in the May 9, 2022 election. However, on July 21, the Supreme Court issued a status quo ante order after his challenger Roberto Uy Jr. protested the election results and the disqualification of nuisance candidate Federico Jalosjos (not related to Romeo Jr.), whose votes were added to the representative's total votes, on June 7. Thus, he vacated his seat before the start of the 19th Congress.

Personal life
Jalosjos is married to Marjorie Nepomuceno Jalosjos, who served as barangay captain of Barangay Patawag, Liloy, Zamboanga del Norte, president of the Liga ng mga Barangay Zamboanga Peninsula, and currently as Assistant Secretary for Special Concerns of the Department of the Interior and Local Government.

Electoral history

References

Romeo Jr.
Living people
Politicians from Zamboanga del Norte
People from Dapitan
Nacionalista Party politicians
Members of the House of Representatives of the Philippines from Zamboanga del Norte
1971 births